La Capital is a local daily newspaper published in Mar del Plata, Argentina, founded in 1905.

The newspaper was founded by Italian immigrant Victorio Tetamanti in 1905, its first edition being published on 25 May, on the 95th anniversary of the May Revolution. Tettamanti was a former steward at landowner Miguel Martinez de Hoz's ranch or estancia near Chapadmalal, then a rural area southwest of Mar del Plata. Tettamanti and Martinez de Hoz were both members of the Comite Mar del Plata ("Mar del Plata Comitee"), with strong links to the local upper class, and shared the same conservative ideology. The paper was instrumental to the election as Mar del Plata's mayor of  Jose Heguilor, another member of the committee, in 1906. The municipality faced a series of crisis from 1906 to 1911, a period characterized by the collapse of locally-elected governments and direct rule by commissioners appointed by the province of Buenos Aires senate. In this new context, La Capital  eventually gave support to the Junta de Resistencia ("Board of Resistance"), a political space that pressed for the continuity of locally-chosen authorities. A democratic process followed, which ended up in 1920 with the election of socialist mayor Teodoro Bronzini. Socialism remained in power until yet another provincial intervention in 1929.

A museum and a library were inaugurated at the premises of the old newspaper's office to celebrate its centennial in 2005.

As of 2019, its average circulation was 10,000.

References 

Mar del Plata
1905 establishments in Argentina
Newspapers established in 1905
Daily newspapers published in Argentina